Jeff Chang may refer to:

Jeff Chang (journalist), American music journalist
Jeff Chang (singer) (born 1967), Taiwanese singer

See also
Geoffrey Chang, American biologist
Jeff Chan (disambiguation)